The mandarin orange (Citrus reticulata), also known as mandarin or mandarine, is a small citrus tree fruit. Treated as a distinct species of orange, it is usually eaten plain or in fruit salads. Tangerines are a group of orange-coloured citrus fruit consisting of hybrids of mandarin orange with some pomelo contribution.

Mandarins are smaller and oblate, unlike the spherical common oranges (which are a mandarin–pomelo hybrid).   The taste is considered sweeter and stronger than the common orange. A ripe mandarin is firm to slightly soft, heavy for its size, and pebbly-skinned. The peel is thin, loose, with little white mesocarp, so they are usually easier to peel and to split into segments. Hybrids usually have these traits to a lesser degree. The mandarin is tender and is damaged easily by cold. It can be grown in tropical and subtropical areas.

According to genetic studies, the mandarin was one of the original citrus species; through breeding or natural hybridization, it is the ancestor of many hybrid citrus cultivars. With the citron and pomelo, it is the ancestor of the most commercially important hybrids (such as sweet and sour oranges, grapefruit, and many lemons and limes). The mandarin has also been hybridized with other citrus species, such as the desert lime and the kumquat. Though the ancestral mandarin was bitter, most commercial mandarin strains derive from hybridization with pomelo, which gives them a sweet fruit.

Etymology 

The name mandarin orange is a calque of Swedish mandarin apelsin [apelsin from German Apfelsine (Apfel + Sina), meaning Chinese apple], first attested in the 18th century. The Imperial Chinese term "mandarine" was first adopted by the French for this fruit. The reason for the epithet is not clear; it may relate to the colour of some robes worn by imperial China's mandarin dignitaries.

Citrus reticulata is from Latin, where reticulata means "netted".

Botany 

The tree trunk and major branches have thorns. The leaves are shiny, green, and rather small. The petioles are short, almost wingless or slightly winged. The flowers are borne singly or in small groups in the leaf-axils. Citrus are usually self-fertile (needing only a bee to move pollen within the same flower) or parthenocarpic (not needing pollination and therefore seedless, such as the satsuma).

Fruit 

Mandarin orange fruits are small . Their colour is orange, yellow-orange, or red-orange. The skin is thin and peels off easily. Their easiness to peel is an important advantage of mandarin oranges over other citrus fruits. Just like with other citrus fruits, the endocarp (inner flesh) is separated into segments, which in their turn consist of a large number of elongated cells. The fruits may be seedless or contain a small number of seeds. Mandarin orange fruits are sweet to taste and can be eaten as whole or squeezed to make juice.

Production 

In 2020, world production of mandarin oranges (combined with tangerines, clementines, and satsumas in reporting to FAOSTAT) was 38.6 million tonnes, led by China with 60% of the global total. Spain produced more than two million tonnes in 2020, while other significant producers with around one million tonnes each were Turkey, Egypt and Morocco.

Uses

Fresh 

Mandarins are generally peeled and eaten fresh or used in salads, desserts and main dishes. Fresh mandarin juice and frozen juice concentrate are commonly available in the United States. The number of seeds in each segment (carpel) varies greatly.

Peel 

The peel is used fresh, whole or zested, or dried as chenpi. It can be used as a spice for cooking, baking, drinks, or candy. Essential oil from the fresh peel may be used as a flavouring for candy, in gelatins, ice cream, chewing gum, and baked goods. It is also used as a flavouring in liqueurs. In Chinese cuisine, the peel of the mandarin orange, called chenpi, is used to flavour sweet dishes and sauces.

Canning 

Canned mandarin segments are peeled to remove the white pith before canning; otherwise, they turn bitter. Segments are peeled using a chemical process. First, the segments are scalded in hot water to loosen the skin; then, they are bathed in a lye solution, which digests the albedo and membranes. Finally, the segments are rinsed several times in plain water. Once orange segments are properly prepared, mandarin oranges undergo heat processing to remove bacteria that can cause spoilage. The oranges are then packed in airtight sealed containers. Ascorbic acid may also be added.

Traditional medicine 

In traditional Chinese medicine, the dried peel of the fruit is used in the regulation of ch'i and to enhance digestion.

Nutrition 

A mandarin orange contains 85% water, 13% carbohydrates, and negligible amounts of fat and protein (table). Among micronutrients, only vitamin C is in significant content (32% of the Daily Value) in a 100-gram reference serving, with all other nutrients in low amounts.

Cultural significance 

In Canada and the United States, they are commonly purchased in 5- or 10-pound boxes, individually wrapped in soft green paper, and given in Christmas stockings. This custom goes back to the 1880s when Japanese immigrants in Canada and the United States began receiving Japanese mandarin oranges from their families back home as gifts for the New Year. The tradition spread among the non-Japanese population and eastwards across the country: each November harvest, "The oranges were quickly unloaded and shipped east by rail. 'Orange Trains' – trains with boxcars painted orange – alerted everyone along the way that the irresistible oranges from Japan were back again for the holidays. For many, the arrival of Japanese mandarin oranges signalled the beginning of the holiday season." This Japanese tradition merged with European traditions related to the Christmas stocking. Saint Nicholas is said to have put gold coins into the stockings of three poor girls so that they would be able to afford to get married. Sometimes the story is told with gold balls instead of bags of gold, and oranges became a symbolic stand-in for these gold balls, and are put in Christmas stockings in Canada along with chocolate coins wrapped in gold foil.

Satsumas were also grown in the United States from the early 1900s. Still, Japan remained a major supplier. U.S. imports of these Japanese oranges was suspended due to hostilities with Japan during World War II. While they were one of the first Japanese goods allowed for export after the end of the war, residual hostility led to the rebranding of these oranges as "mandarin" oranges.

The delivery of the first batch of mandarin oranges from Japan in the port of Vancouver, British Columbia (Canada) is greeted with a festival that combines Santa Claus and Japanese dancers—young girls dressed in traditional kimono.

Historically, the Christmas fruit sold in North America was mostly Dancys, but now it is more often a hybrid.

Literature 

In Canadian literature, particularly in Gabrielle Roy's novel about Montreal, The Tin Flute, a mandarin orange figures as a  touch of luxury for the dying son of the poor Lacasse family, around which the novel is woven. Mandarin oranges are mentioned in  Sinclair Ross' 1942 novel, As for Me and My House, and his 1939 short story, Cornet at Night.

Genetics and origin 

Mandarins are one of the core ancestral citrus taxa, and are thought to have evolved in regions including South China and Japan in East Asia, and Vietnam in Southeast Asia.  Mandarins appear to have been domesticated at least twice, in the north and south Nanling Mountains, derived from separate wild subspecies.  Wild mandarins are still found there, including Daoxian mandarines (sometimes given the species name Citrus daoxianensis) as well as some members of the group traditionally called 'Mangshan wild mandarins', a generic grouping for the wild mandarin-like fruit of the Mangshan area that includes both true mandarins (mangshanyeju, the southern subspecies) and the genetically distinct and only distantly-related Mangshanyegan. The wild mandarins were found free of the introgressed pomelo (C. maxima) DNA found in domestic mandarins. Still, they did appear to have small amounts (~1.8%) of introgression from the ichang papeda, which grows wild in the same region.

The Nanling Mountains are also home to northern and southern genetic clusters of domestic mandarins that have similar levels of sugars in the fruit compared to their wild relatives but appreciably (in some almost 90-fold) lower levels of citric acid.  The clusters display different patterns of pomelo introgression, have different deduced historical population histories, and are most closely related to distinct wild mandarins, suggesting two independent domestications in the north and south.  All tested domesticated cultivars were found to belong to one of these two genetic clusters, with varieties such as Nanfengmiju, Kishu and Satsuma deriving from the northern domestication event producing larger, redder fruit, while Willowleaf, Dancy, Sunki, Cleopatra, King, Ponkan, and others derived from the smaller, yellower-fruited southern cluster.

The Tanaka classification system divided domestic mandarins and similar fruit into numerous species, giving distinct names to cultivars such as willowleaf mandarins (C. deliciosa), satsumas (C. unshiu), tangerines (C. tangerina). Under the Swingle system, all these are considered to be varieties of a single species, Citrus reticulata.  Hodgson represented them as several subgroups: common (C. reticulata), Satsuma, King (C. nobilis), Mediterranean (willowleaf), small-fruited (C. indica, C. tachibana and C. reshni), and mandarin hybrids. In the genomic-based species taxonomy of Ollitrault et al., only pure mandarins would fall under C. reticulata, while the pomelo admixture found in the majority of mandarins would cause them to be classified as varieties of C. aurantium.

Genetic analysis is consistent with continental mandarins representing a single species, with much of the variation within mandarins being due to hybridization. A separate species, Citrus ryukyuensis that diverged from the mainland species between 2 and 3 million years ago when cut off by rising sea levals was found growing on the island of Okinawa, and its natural and agricultural hybridization with the mainland mandarin species has produced some of the unique island mandarin cultivars of Japan and Taiwan, such as the Tachibana orange, previously classified as a subspecies of pure mandarin before its parent was identified, and the Shekwasha. Some of the small number of cultivars were found to be pure in initial gemonic analysis, including Sun Chu Sha mandarin and Nanfengmiju, but Wang detected in them not only an apparent Ichang papeda introgression found in all examined mandarins but also the distinct pomelo DNA of the domesticated mandarins. Following initial hybridization, natural or cultivated backcrosses of the initial mandarin-pomelo hybrids with the mandarin stock produced mandarins with limited pomelo contribution, that differed between the northern and southern domesticates.  An 'acidic' group of cultivars including Sunki and Cleopatra mandarins that likewise previously were thought to be pure but since found to contain small regions of introgressed pomelo DNA are too sour to be edible, but are widely used as rootstock and grown for juice.  Another group of mandarins, including some tangerines, Satsuma and King mandarins, show a greater pomelo contribution and derive from the limited-pomelo hybrids being crossed again, with sweet orange or pomelo, and likewise backcrossing in some cases, producing cultivars with moderate to high levels of pomelo introgression.  Hybrid mandarins thus fall on a continuum of increasing pomelo contribution with clementines, sweet and sour oranges, and grapefruit.  Mandarins and their hybrids are sold under a variety of names.

Varieties

Stem mandarins (Citrus reticulata) 

 Mangshan wild mandarins (only some, others being the genetically distinct mangshanyegan)
 Daoxian mandarines
 Suanpangan

Domesticated mandarins and hybrids 

(Species names are those from the Tanaka system. Recent genomic analysis would place them all in Citrus reticulata, except the C. ryukyuensis hybrids)

 Sun Chu Sha
 Nanfengmiju - one of China's most widely cultivated varieties.
 Cleopatra mandarin, acidic mandarin containing very small amount of pomelo introgression.
 Sunki, acidic mandarin containing very small amount of pomelo introgression.
 Tangerines (Citrus tangerina) is a grouping used for several distinct mandarin hybrids.  Those sold in the US as tangerines have usually been Dancy, Sunburst or Murcott (Honey) cultivars.  Some tangerine × grapefruit hybrids are legally sold as tangerines in the USA.
 Mediterranean/Willowleaf/Thorny (Citrus × deliciosa), a mandarin with small amounts of pomelo.
 Dalanghita (Citrus reticulata) is a smaller mandarin endemic widely cultivated in the Philippines. Also known by other local names, naranghita and sintones.
 Huanglingmiao (Citrus reticulata), a mandarin–pomelo hybrid.
 Kishumikan (Citrus reticulata), or simply Kishu, a close clonal relative of Huanglingmiao, the two sharing a common origin before diverging as they were propagated
 Kunenbo (Citrus nobilis) a heterogeneous group that includes at least four distinct mandarin-pomelo hybrids.
 King (in full, 'King of Siam', Citrus nobilis) a Kunenbo mandarin with high levels of pomelo admixture, sometimes classed as a tangor.
 Kinnow (see image), a King × Willowleaf hybrid.
 Satsuma (Citrus unshiu), a mandarin × pomelo hybrid with more pomelo than seen in most mandarins. It derived from a cross between a Huanglingmiao/Kishu and a non-King Kunenbo that was itself a pomelo × Huanglingmiao/Kishu cross.
 Owari, a well-known  cultivar that ripens during the late autumn
 Komikan, a variety of Kishumikan
 The Ponkan (Citrus reticulata), a mandarin–pomelo hybrid
 The Dancy tangerine (Citrus tangerina) is a hybrid, the cross of a Ponkan with another unidentified hybrid mandarin. Until the 1970s, most tangerines grown and eaten in the USA were Dancys, and it was known as "Christmas tangerine" and zipper-skin tangerine
 Iyokan (Citrus iyo), a cross between the Dancy tangerine and another Japanese mandarin variety, the kaikoukan.
 Bang Mot tangerine, a mandarin variety popular in Thailand.
 Shekwasha (Citrus depressa), a group of clonal citrus that arose from multiple independent natural crosses of C. ryukyuensis with a Sun Chu Sha relative, a very sour mandarin grown for its acidic juice.
 Tachibana, also a cluster of similar clones, deriving from natural crosses between different individual C. ryukyuensis and a clonal C. reticulata lineage with both northern and southern subspecies contribution.

Mandarin crosses 

 Tangelos, a generic term for modern mandarin (tangerine) × pomelo and mandarin × grapefruit crosses
 The Mandelo or 'cocktail grapefruit', a cross between a Dancy/King mixed mandarin and a pomelo. The term is also sometimes used generically, like a tangelo, for recent mandarin × pomelo hybrids.
 The sour orange (Citrus x aurantium) derives from a direct cross between a pure mandarin and a pomelo
 Lemon (Citrus x limon), a sour orange × citron hybrid.
 Lime (Citrus x latifolia), a lemon × Key lime cross
 Bergamot orange (Citrus x bergamia), a lemon × sour orange backcross
 Limetta (Citrus limetta), a distinct sour orange × citron hybrid
 The common sweet orange (Citrus x sinensis) derives from a cross between a non-pure mandarin and pomelo parents
 Tangors, or Temple oranges, are crosses between the mandarin orange and the common sweet orange; their thick rind is easy to peel, and its bright orange pulp is sour-sweet and full-flavoured. Some such hybrids are commonly called mandarins or tangerines.
 Clementine (Citrus × clementina), a spontaneous hybrid between a Willowleaf mandarin orange and a sweet orange. sometimes known as a "Thanksgiving Orange" or "Christmas orange", as its peak season is winter; an important commercial mandarin orange form, having displaced mikans in many markets.

 Clemenules or Nules, a variety of Clementine named for the Valencian town where it was first bred in 1953; it is the most popular variety of Clementine grown in Spain.
 Fairchild is a hybrid of Clementine and Orlando tangelo
 Murcott, a mandarin × sweet orange hybrid, one parent being the King.
 Tango is a proprietary seedless mid-late season irradiated selection of Murcott developed by the University of California Citrus Breeding Program.
 Kiyomi (Citrus unshiu × sinensis) is a Satsuma/sweet orange hybrid from Japan
 Dekopon, a hybrid between Kiyomi and ponkan, marketed in the United States as Sumo Citrus(R)
 Grapefruit (Citrus x paradisi), the result of backcrossing the sweet orange with pomelo
 Meyer lemon (Citrus x meyer), a cross between a mandarin × pomelo hybrid and a citron.
 Palestinian sweet lime (Citrus x limettioides), a distinct (mandarin × pomelo) × citron hybrid
 Rangpur lime (Citrus x limonia), a pure-mandarin × citron cross
 Rough lemon (Citrus x jambhiri), a pure-mandarin × citron cross, distinct from rangpur
 Volkamer lemon (Citrus volkameriana), a pure-mandarin x citron cross, distinct from rangpur and rough lemon
 Jabara (Citrus jabara), a Kunenbo mandarin × yuzu cross.
 several of the kumquat-hybrid Citrofortunella, including calamansi, citrangequat, orangequat, mandarinquat and sunquat

Non-mandarins 

 Mangshanyegans, long thought to be mandarins, are a separate species.

See also 

 Japanese citrus
 List of citrus fruits
 Tangerine
 Citrus unshiu
 Ju Song – "In Praise of the Orange-Tree"
 Orange (fruit)

References 

Citrus
Fruits originating in Asia
Christmas food
Sinterklaas food
Fruit trees
Flora of China
Flora of Japan
Flora of Vietnam